The voiceless retroflex trill is a sound that has been reported to occur as an allophone of  in the Maldivian language. Although the tongue starts out in a sub-apical retroflex position, trilling involves the tip of the tongue and causes it to move forward to the alveolar ridge; this means that the retroflex trill gives a preceding vowel retroflex coloration the way other retroflex consonants do, but the vibration itself is not much different from an alveolar trill.

Features
Features of the voiceless retroflex trill:

Occurrence

Notes

References

 

Retroflex consonants
Trill consonants
Pulmonic consonants
Voiceless oral consonants
Central consonants